The John of Gaunt School is a mixed secondary school and sixth form located in Trowbridge in the English county of Wiltshire. The school is named after John of Gaunt, 1st Duke of Lancaster, as the school is built upon land that he once owned.

History

Predecessors
The school's predecessors were Trowbridge Girls' High School and Trowbridge Boys' High School, single-sex grammar schools which were established in 1912 on two sites: on Wingfield Road (boys) and nearby on Gloucester Road (girls). These formed a co-educational grammar school, the Combined High Schools, on 14 April 1969.

Creation

In August 1974, the school became a coeducational comprehensive school and was renamed The John of Gaunt School. Previously a community school administered by Wiltshire Council, The John of Gaunt School converted to academy status on 1 April 2012. However, the school continues to coordinate with Wiltshire Council for admissions.

The John of Gaunt School offers GCSEs and BTECs as programmes of study for pupils, as well as some vocational courses offered in conjunction with Wiltshire College. Students in the sixth form have the option to study from a range of A-levels and further BTECs.

Notable former pupils
 Nick Blackwell, boxer
 Rob Chapman, musician and guitar company owner
 Keri Davies, radio producer and playwright
 Jordan Daykin, entrepreneur
 Tom Gale, Olympic high jumper
 Gemma Hunt, CBBC and CBeebies presenter
 Chris Stokes, footballer

Trowbridge Boys' High School
 John Atyeo (1932–1993), prolific goal-scorer for Bristol City who also scored for England
 Sir William Richard Joseph Cook, mathematician, who largely led the British hydrogen bomb programme in the 1950s
 Kenneth Harris, former chief interviewer for The Observer newspaper
 Tony Lane, nuclear physicist
 John Henry Pyle Pafford, librarian and editor
 James Rodway (1848–1926), botanist and historian of Guyana
 Alan Smith, Bishop of St Albans since 2009, and Member of the House of Lords

Trowbridge Girls' High School
 Janet Anderson (briefly), Labour MP from 1992 to 2010 for Rossendale and Darwen
 Maureen Duffy, author
 Prof Joan M. Hussey, Professor of History from 1950 to 1974 at the University of London
 Deborah Meaden, businesswoman and television personality on Dragons' Den
 Bel Mooney, journalist and broadcaster
 Marjorie Reeves, historian

References

External links
 
 

Secondary schools in Wiltshire
Trowbridge
Academies in Wiltshire